Izvestiya Vysshikh Uchebnykh Zavedenii. Radioelektronika is a monthly peer-reviewed scientific journal published in Ukraine that covers electrical engineering, electronic engineering, and electronics. An English translation is published as  Radioelectronics and Communications Systems. The Russian-language version is published by the Kiev Polytechnic Institute and is one of several journals from the series Izvestiya Vysshikh Uchebnykh Zavedenii published by different institutes of the Soviet Union.

Scope 
The journal covers theoretical problems of radio-engineering, results of research, materials of scientific conferences and meetings, information on scientific work in higher educational institutions, news, and bibliographic materials.

The journal contains the following sections:

Abstracting and indexing 
The journal is abstracted and indexed in Academic OneFile, Inspec, SCOPUS, Russian Science Citation Index, VINITI, Gale, OCLC, SCImago, Summon by Serial Solutions and EI-Compendex.

History 
The journal was established in 1958 as Izvestiya Vysshikh Uchebnykh Zavedenii Ministry of Higher and Specialized Secondary Education USSR. Radiotekhnika, with S. I. Tetel'baum as editor-in-chief. It was renamed in 1967 as Izvestiya Vysshikh Uchebnykh Zavedenii Ministry of Higher and Specialized Secondary Education USSR. Radioelektronika with Yaroslav K. Trokhimenko as editor-in-chief. The journal obtained its current title in 1992. Fedor F. Dubrovka succeeded Trokhimenko as editor-in-chief in 2009.

In 1992, the Ministry of Education and Science of Ukraine and the Kiev Polytechnic Institute took over the publication of the journal.

English version 
In 1968, Faraday Press (United States) published the first issue of the English version of the journal, which was published as Radioelectronics and Communications Systems. From 1977, translation and publication of the journal moved to Allerton Press. Since 2007, the English version is distributed by Springer Science+Business Media.

External links 
 

Publications established in 1958
Publications established in 1968
English-language journals
Russian-language journals
Semiconductor journals
Monthly journals
Springer Science+Business Media academic journals
Hybrid open access journals
Igor Sikorsky Kyiv Polytechnic Institute
Academic journals published in Ukraine